Simon William Day (born 7 June 1962) is an English comedian and actor known for his roles in the sketch show The Fast Show and the sitcom Grass.

Career
Day was born in Blackheath, London, and rose to fame as a stand-up comic, winning the Time Out new act of the year in 1991 with his music hall character Tommy Cockles. He then appeared on the BBC One show Paramount City as a weekly guest. He continued working live all over England before joining up with Vic Reeves and Bob Mortimer for two tours and two series of Big Night Out. He continued to work with Vic Reeves throughout the 1990s.

In 1994 he was a cast regular in Saturday Zoo, Channel 4's Saturday night extravaganza, in which he appeared as groundbreaking white rapper Ice Pick. His other TV credits include Heartbeat, Jonathan Creek, Sensitive Skin, Love Soup, Driving School, and Skins. His film credits include Shakespeare in Love, as a ferryman on the Thames.

In 2006 he collaborated with The Transit Kings on their song "The Last Lighthouse Keeper" which appears on their debut album Living in a Giant Candle Winking at God.

In 2008 Day embarked on his first solo UK stand-up tour, titled 'What a Fool Believes', which saw him play 36 dates during the period 30 October - 15 December, including Dundee, Edinburgh and Glasgow.

In 2009, Day collaborated again with Rhys Thomas and wrote and starred in a web series of six videos as the character Brian Pern for the BBC.

In 2010, Day appeared in the long-running BBC TV series Hustle, playing Luke Baincross, a wannabe playboy with a huge country mansion.

In May 2010, Day played a hospital porter in BBC TV series Holby City on his last day at work following his resignation having won the National Lottery. He had an altercation with a patient's relative and received a bang on the head, and he became increasingly lairy during the episode, at one point making a pass at Connie Beauchamp; some people assumed he was drunk, but it transpired that he had developed a Subdural hematoma as a result of the knock on the head.

Day has appeared as a pundit on the long-running BBC Radio 5 Live Sports Pundit Quiz Fighting Talk on a number of occasions, and is most notable for swearing during a live broadcast during a show in 2009. This was later edited out on the podcast version of the show.

Day appeared in an online-only version of The Fast Show sponsored by Lager brand Fosters on 10 November 2011 along with original cast save for Mark Williams.

In 2012, he published his autobiography, Comedy and Error: They Really Were Marvellous Times.

Day has presented his own series, The Simon Day Show on BBC Radio 4 in May to June 2012.

From 2014 to 2017, he co-wrote and starred in the spoof-documentary series Brian Pern, a BBC Four comedy which parodied the life and career of former Genesis singer Peter Gabriel.

In 2015 Day appeared as Charlie Beckett in the BBC TV series Death in Paradise episode 4.2. In 2019 he appeared as Sid Onslow, a pub landlord, in Pennyworth.

Day starred as Big Gary King, father of Tom Davis' titular character in the BBC One sitcom King Gary, appearing in the 2018 pilot episode and the full series broadcast in 2020.

Day reprised his Fast Show character 'Dave Angel, Eco Warrior' in 2021 in  energy usage advertising.

Personal life
Day's teenage life was troubled: he was addicted to alcohol, drugs and gambling, and spent some time in borstal for theft. He continued to take illegal drugs including cocaine and crack cocaine into the 1990s at the height of his Fast Show fame.

After failing to pass his driving test for charity during the 2003 Comic Relief Programme, Day later went on to gain an automatic driving licence. He is married to Ruth, a former waitress, with whom he has two children, Lloyd and Evie.

Filmography

Film

Television

References

External links

Japanese site with pictures of characters he plays
Site containing complete scripts for Day's Gideon Soames sketches

1962 births
Alumni of the University of East Anglia
BBC Radio 4 presenters
British comedians
British sketch comedians
Comedians from London
English autobiographers
Living people
People from Blackheath, London
The Fast Show